Tsalenjikha (also transliterated as Tsalendjikha and Tzalenjikha) is a town in Samegrelo-Zemo Svaneti region of western Georgia with the population of 3,847 (2014). It is located on the river Chanistsqali. Historically, Tsalenjikha functioned as one of the residences of the Dadiani princess of Mingrelia and a bishopric seat with a medieval cathedral of the Savior.

Etymology
"Tsalenjikha" is a composite toponym, meaning in Mingrelian either "the fortress of Chan" (I. Kipchidze, S. Janashia) or "the lower fortress" (A. Chikobava).

People from Tsalenjikha
Tsalenjikha is the birthplace of the famous Georgian poet, Terenti Graneli.

Georgi Tsurtsumia (born October 29, 1980), Georgian-Kazakh wrestler who competed in the Men's Greco-Roman 120 kg at the 2004 Summer Olympics and won the silver medal.

Antisa Khvichava (1880–2012), Supposedly the World's Oldest Person who claimed to have been born in 1880. died on 30 September 2012, purportedly at the claimed age of 132.

Khvicha Kvaratskhelia (born February 12, 2001), Georgian professional footballer who plays as a winger for Serie A club Napoli and the Georgia national football team.

See also
 Samegrelo-Zemo Svaneti

References

External links 

Samegrelo-Zemo Svaneti Regional Administration

Cities and towns in Samegrelo-Zemo Svaneti
Kutaisi Governorate